On 2 February 2022, over 60 civilians from the Hema ethnic group were killed in a massacre in Djugu territory, Ituri Province, Democratic Republic of the Congo.

During the early hours, CODECO insurgents armed with machetes and edged weapons attacked Plaine Savo, a camp for internally displaced people in the northeast of the country in which around 4,000 people live. Forces from the Congolese military made contact with the CODECO militia prior to the attack but were bypassed when the assailants changed direction."I first heard cries when I was still in bed. Then several minutes of gunshots. I fled and I saw torches and people crying for help and I realised it was the CODECO militiamen who had invaded our site."

– Local residentFour people, including the chief of the Bahema N’adhere community, were hospitalized.

See also

 2021–2022 Democratic Republic of the Congo attacks

References

2022 in the Democratic Republic of the Congo
2022 murders in the Democratic Republic of the Congo
21st-century mass murder in Africa
February 2022 crimes in Africa
February 2022 events in Africa
Ituri conflict
Massacres in 2022
Massacres in the Democratic Republic of the Congo
Terrorist incidents in Africa in 2022